Flannagan is a name. Notable people with the name include:

 Charlie Flannagan (born 1933), Australian rules footballer 
 John Flannagan (disambiguation), multiple people, including:
John Flannagan (Medal of Honor) (born 1852), American sailor and Medal of Honor recipient
John Flannagan (priest) (1860–1926), Catholic priest and president of St. Ambrose College
John Bernard Flannagan (1895–1942) American sculptor
John W. Flannagan, Jr. (1885–1955), American politician
 Sarah-Jane and Anna Flannagan (nineteenth century), New Zealand murderers
 Flannagan mac Ceallach (fl. 879), Irish poet

See also
Flanagan (disambiguation)
Flannigan (disambiguation)